Christopher Beatty (born June 19, 1973) is an American football assistant coach. Beatty is currently the wide receivers coach for the Los Angeles Chargers football team. Beatty was formerly a professional football player in the Canadian Football League and a former school-record holder at East Tennessee State University as a wide receiver.

Early life
Christopher Beatty was born in 1973 in Topeka, Kansas, but grew up in Centreville, Virginia. Beatty attended Chantilly High School in Chantilly, Virginia, where he graduated in 1991. Upon his graduation, Beatty attended East Tennessee State.

From 1991 to 1994, he was a starter at wide receiver where he earned All-Southern Conference honors his senior season. He ended his career as the school's all-time leader in receiving yards with 1,813 yards on 125 receptions.

Professional playing career
Following his graduation of ETSU with a bachelor's degree in 1995, Beatty moved on to play professional football in the Canadian Football League with the Baltimore Stallions. In 1997, Beatty played for the CFL's Hamilton Tiger-Cats before retiring from his playing career.

Coaching career

High school
Chris Beatty began his coaching career in 1998 with North Stafford High School in Virginia as the school's head coach. Beatty coached the Wolverines football team until 2000, when he moved on to Salem High School in Virginia Beach, Virginia. After compiling a 38-16 record at North Stafford HS and Salem HS (and leading both schools to the state playoffs), Beatty moved on from Salem following the 2002 season.

From 2003 to 2006, Beatty coached Landstown High School in Virginia Beach. During his three-year tenure, Beatty led the team to three straight state championship games and a 40-2 record. The 2004 team won the Virginia 3-A state championship and earned a No. 9 national ranking with a 14-0 record, led by future college football and NFL player Percy Harvin.

During his tenure at the high school ranks, Beatty compiled a 78-18 record at three different high schools. Beatty was named the 2004 Virginia High School League AAA Coach of the Year for his state championship team with Landstown High. Also during his prep tenure, he coordinated offenses that produced the top four passers in Virginia High School history and led the only two teams in state history to have a 3,000-yard passer, a 1,000-yard receiver, and a 1,000-yard rusher in the same season.

Hampton University
Chris Beatty left Landstown High School for the offensive coordinator and quarterback coaching position at Virginia's Hampton University in 2006. Beatty only stayed at Hampton for the 2006 season, but his team produced a 10-2 record and lost to New Hampshire 41-38 in the first round of the FCS playoffs. The team also won the Mideastern Athletic Conference championship with a 6-1 conference record. Boasting the No. 7 scoring offense in the FCS at 34.2 points per game, the 2006 team also produced a player drafted in the 2007 NFL Draft and six players who signed contracts with National Football League teams, four being offensive players coached by Beatty—including Dereck Faulkner, Onrea Jones and Marquay McDaniel.

Northern Illinois University
Following his 2006 stint at Hampton University, Beatty was offered and accepted the position as Northern Illinois' running backs coach for the 2007 season. Beatty's Huskies had previously had a player rush for over 1,000 yards in the previous eight seasons before his arrival, including the school leader and third-round NFL Draft selection, Garrett Wolfe, who departed the team the season before Beatty's arrival.

In Beatty's only season at NIU, the Huskies posted a 2-10 record. However, sophomore running back Justin Anderson rushed for 1,245 yards and 8 touchdowns in the season under Beatty. The 1,000-yard performance extended the school's record to nine consecutive seasons.

West Virginia University
After his season at Northern Illinois University as the team's running backs coach, Beatty was offered the same position at West Virginia University for new head coach Bill Stewart. Beatty accepted the offer and entered the spring coaching the running backs, led by sophomore Noel Devine, and the slot receivers, led by sophomore Jock Sanders.

Devine rushed for more than 3,600 yards under Beatty's guidance, and twice earning All-Big East Conference honors. The fleet-footed Devine concluded his Mountaineer career with more than 4,000 rushing yards, ranking fourth all-time in Big East Conference history. Devine also finished as West Virginia's all-time leader in all-purpose yardage.

Sanders ranked as one of the Big East's most productive receivers, catching 195 passes with Beatty as his mentor. Sanders concluded his career as West Virginia's all-time leading receiver - and second all-time in the Big East. He also posted a reception in 41 consecutive games.

The Mountaineer rushing attack also ranked among the Big East's best during all three of Beatty's years with the program.

Vanderbilt University
In January 2011 Beatty was hired as wide receivers coach and recruiting coordinator at Vanderbilt University by new head coach James Franklin.

University of Illinois
On January 3, 2012 it was announced that Beatty was hired as assistant coach at the University of Illinois at Urbana–Champaign by new head coach Tim Beckman. On January 5, 2013, it was announced that Beatty would not be retained for the coming season.

University of Wisconsin
February 14, 2013 First-year Wisconsin head coach Gary Andersen hires Chris Beatty as the Badgers' wide receivers coach.

University of Virginia
On January 14, 2015, Beatty became the running backs coach at the University of Virginia. He was recently promoted to assistant head coach for offense.

Former Prominent Players Coached

References

External links
Chris Beatty's Northern Illinois Profile
Chris Beatty's West Virginia Profile
Chris Beatty's Vanderbilt Profile
Chris Beatty's Wisconsin Profile
Chris Beatty's Virginia Profile

1973 births
Living people
Sportspeople from Topeka, Kansas
Sportspeople from Fairfax County, Virginia
People from Centreville, Virginia
American football wide receivers
East Tennessee State Buccaneers football players
American players of Canadian football
Canadian football wide receivers
Baltimore Stallions players
Hamilton Tiger-Cats players
High school football coaches in Virginia
Hampton Pirates football coaches
Northern Illinois Huskies football coaches
West Virginia Mountaineers football coaches
Illinois Fighting Illini football coaches
Wisconsin Badgers football coaches
Virginia Cavaliers football coaches
Maryland Terrapins football coaches
Pittsburgh Panthers football coaches
Los Angeles Chargers coaches